Movva mandal is one of the 50 mandals in the Krishna district of the Indian state of Andhra Pradesh.  Movva Mandal is the birth place of Siddendra Yogi, hailed from Kuchipudi, founder of Kuchipudi Dance.

References 

Mandals in Krishna district